The Jameh Mosque of Eslamiyeh is related to the Qajar dynasty and is located in the Taft County of Eslamiyeh, the historical axis.

Sources 

Mosques in Iran
Mosque buildings with domes
National works of Iran
Eslamiyeh